First Place Tower is a skyscraper located at 15 East Fifth in downtown Tulsa, Oklahoma. It was completed in 1973 and has 41 stories. At  in height, it is the third tallest building in Tulsa behind BOK Tower and Cityplex Towers, and the fourth tallest in Oklahoma. Although it shares an address with the adjacent First National Bank Building, it faces Boston Avenue.

From 2006 to 2017 it was owned by Maurice Kanbar, a California entrepreneur who had extensive holdings in downtown Tulsa until he sold a portfolio of his holdings, including this building, in 2017 to his operating partner, Stuart Price.

See also
Buildings of Tulsa, Oklahoma
List of tallest buildings in Tulsa
List of tallest buildings in Oklahoma

Notes

References

External links
Emporis
Kanbar Properties

Skyscraper office buildings in Tulsa, Oklahoma
Office buildings completed in 1973
1973 establishments in Oklahoma